The 1985–86 Wills Cup was the fifth edition of the Wills Cup, which was the premiere domestic limited overs cricket competition in Pakistan and afforded List A status. Eleven teams participated in the competition which was held from 8 to 27 September 1985.

Venues

Group stage

Group A

Points Table

Source:

Group B

Points Table

Source:

Semi-finals

Final

References

National One Day Championship seasons
Wills Cup